Riley Towers are three residential high-rise apartment buildings in downtown Indianapolis, Indiana, United States. Riley Towers were conceived as part of an expansive urban renewal project known as Project H. The complex was constructed between 1962 and 1963. Towers I and II have 30 floors and Tower III has 16 floors. Riley Towers I and II are the tallest residential buildings in the state of Indiana. The towers are distinctive for their cantilevered corner balconies.

The complex is owned and managed by Indianapolis-based Barrett & Stokely, Inc., which purchased the property in 1993. Amenities include a three-level parking garage; a private outdoor swimming pool, lounge, and grilling area; a fitness center; and ground-level retail. An open-air skyway spans E. North St., connecting Tower I to the complex's parking structure.

The complex is named for famed poet James Whitcomb Riley, whose museum home stands in the nearby Lockerbie Square Historic District.

History
Under director Calvin S. Hamilton, the Metropolitan Planning Department prepared a downtown master plan in 1958, which recommended the clearance of "declining" properties in the district for redevelopment. Among the first city-supported urban renewal projects, Project H covered  in the northeast quadrant of downtown Indianapolis. In 1961, local investors formed the Riley Center Corporation and announced plans to build a four-phased, $40 million "apartment city" consisting of ten high-rises containing more than 1,800 units. Perkins and Will was hired to design the complex.

Beginning in 1962, Phase I included the redevelopment of  bordered by Hudson St. (west); N. Alabama St. (east); Fort Wayne Ave. and E. St. Clair St. (north); and E. Michigan St. (south). Plans included the construction of two 30-story buildings and a third 16-story building containing 500 apartment units, a parking garage, and a restaurant building. However, a year after construction, the complex remained only 50 percent leased forcing the cancellation of future phases. Some  from Project H were later developed in the early-1980s as a low-rise condominium community called Renaissance Place.

Boston-based Windsor Property Group and local developer Joseph F. Sexton entered into a partnership to purchase the complex in 1987 with plans for a $6.5 million renovation. Renovations began in March 1988. Soon after, complaints of mismanagement by residents and maintenance staff, coupled with financial problems, stalled the project. Unable to complete the renovations, the partnership defaulted on a loan from Bank of New England whose assets were seized by the Federal Deposit Insurance Corporation. In December 1992, ownership was transferred to lender Fleet-Norstar Financial Group, which held a $23.5 million mortgage on the complex.

The FDIC sold the complex to local real estate management company Barrett & Stokely in September 1993 for $10 million. Over the following year, the company completed $3.5 million in renovations, including those that stalled under the previous ownership. Among the changes were new roofs, HVAC and security systems, and repair of the towers' brick and mortar veneer. The restaurant building was also converted into a leasing office, fitness center, and community meeting room.

On the evening of January 15, 1992, two decorative spires from atop Tower II collapsed onto Alabama St., striking an unoccupied vehicle. No injuries were reported.

In August 2010, the complex's original 450-space parking garage was demolished and rebuilt for $6 million.

All three buildings continued to have sporadic water infiltration problems as they aged. In 2021, the outer layer of bricks on the façade of the 16-story Tower III was replaced with new bricks with an air membrane being placed between the bricks and the layer of block in the walls. The new bricks are custom made to be as close a match as possible to the original ones. The successful completion of work on that building led the owners to obtain approval from the Metropolitan Development Commission Regional Center hearing examiner to undertake the same repairs on the Towers I and II in August 2022. Work is expected to be completed by June 2023.

Notable residents
Otis Bowen, 44th Governor of Indiana
Scott Dixon, professional racing driver
Edgar Whitcomb, 43rd Governor of Indiana

See also
List of tallest buildings in Indiana
List of tallest buildings in Indianapolis

References

External links

Riley Towers I at Skyscraper Page
Riley Towers II at Skyscraper Page
Riley Towers III at Skyscraper Page
Riley Towers I at Emporis
Riley Towers II at Emporis
Riley Towers III at Emporis

Residential buildings completed in 1963
Apartment buildings in Indiana
Twin towers
Residential skyscrapers in Indianapolis
1963 establishments in Indiana